The  was a fleet of the Imperial Japanese Navy organized after the Battle of Shanghai. It reported directly to the Imperial General Headquarters and had the same organizational level as the Combined Fleet.

Organizations of the China Area Fleet and Subordinate Units

China Area Fleet

Structure (extract)

Commanders of the China Area Fleet

Chief of staff

1st China Expeditionary Fleet
The  was reorganized from the 3rd Fleet on 15 November 1939. Their role was the guard of the coast in China at first, however, it changed for the guard in the down stream area of the Yangtze River.
Structure (extract)

Commanders of the 3rd Fleet

Commander in chief 1st China Expeditionary Fleet and commander (Yangtze River Area Base Force)

Chief of staff (3rd Fleet and 1st China Expeditionary Fleet)

2nd China Expeditionary Fleet
The  was reorganized from the 5th Fleet on 15 November 1939. The 5th Fleet was reinforcements for 3rd Fleet and 4th Fleet. Their role was the guard and invasion of South China. The 2nd China Expeditionary Fleet kept appearance of a fleet until the end of war.
Structure (extract)

Commanders of the 5th Fleet

Commanders of the 2nd China Expeditionary Fleet

Chief of staff

3rd China Expeditionary Fleet
The  was reorganized from the 4th Fleet on 15 November 1939. The 4th Fleet was reinforcements for 3rd Fleet. Their role was the guard in Bohai Sea. Describe 4th Fleet and 3rd China Expeditionary Fleet in this section. The 3rd China Expeditionary Fleet was specialization to guard unit for Qingdao and become extinct.
Structure (extract)

Commanders of the 4th Fleet

Commanders of the 3rd China Expeditionary Fleet

Chief of staff

Organizations of pre-China Area Fleet
Describe about pre-China Area Fleet in this section. The Southern Qing Fleet, China Expeditionary Fleet, 1st Expeditionary Fleet and 2nd Expeditionary Fleet were ancestor of China Area Fleet.

Southern Qing Fleet
The  was organized after the Russo-Japanese War. They were reinforced by Xinhai Revolution in 1911, however, Beiyang Government declared neutrality in World War I. All gunboats were detained, and Southern Qing Fleet became extinct before long.
Structure (extract)

Commander

Chief of staff

China Expeditionary Fleet/1st Expeditionary Fleet
Their ancestor was  under World War I. They became 11th Division only for gunboats and became extinct.

Structure (extract)

Commander

2nd Expeditionary Fleet
The  was organized on 16 May 1927 for reinforcements for 1st Expeditionary Fleet. Their role was the guard of Northern China.
Structure (extract)

Commander

Bibliography
Monograph: Year of 1900 - Extract of naval war history of Qing Incident, each volume
Fleet boat division organization and warship torpedo boat deployment, each volume
Vessels boat service list, each volume
 Senshi Sōsho each volume, Asagumo Simbun (Japan)
Rekishi Dokuhon, Special issue No. 33 Overview of admirals of the Imperial Japanese Navy, Shin-Jinbutsuōraisha, 1999
The Japanese Modern Historical Manuscripts Association, Organizations, structures and personnel affairs of the Imperial Japanese Army & Navy, University of Tokyo Press, 1971 
The Maru Special series each volume,  (Japan)
Ships of the World series each volume, (Japan)

Fleets of the Imperial Japanese Navy
Military units and formations established in 1937
Military units and formations disestablished in 1945